

Results

Scottish First Division

Final standings

Drybrough Cup

Scottish League Cup

Group stage

Group 2 final table

Knockout stage

Scottish Cup

UEFA Cup

References

Aberdeen F.C. seasons
Aberdeen
Aberdeen